1979 Girabola was the annual national Angola football (soccer) tournament, Girabola, held in 1979. It was the first national championship organized after Angola achieved independence in 1975. Due to the Angolan Civil War this was the first (and only) tournament that included teams from all Angolan provinces. By then, there were only sixteen provinces. Later on, the province of Lunda was split in two: Lunda Norte and Lunda Sul and Bengo was also created.

On the course of the championship, Sporting Clube de Luanda was renamed as Diabos Verdes.

Twenty-for teams were divided into four groups of six teams each with the top team advancing to the semi-finals.

João Machado of Diabos Verdes finished as the top scorer with 18 goals.

League table

Preliminary rounds

Serie A

Round 1

Round 6

Round 2

Round 7

Round 3

Round 8

Round 4

Round 9

Round 5

Round 10

Table and results

Serie B

Round 1

Round 6

Round 2

Round 7

Round 3

Round 8

Round 4

Round 9

Round 5

Round 10

Table and results

Serie C

Round 1

Round 6

Round 2

Round 7

Round 3

Round 8

Round 4

Round 9

Round 5

Round 10

Table and results

Serie D

Round 1

Round 6

Round 2

Round 7

Round 3

Round 8

Round 4

Round 9

Round 5

Round 10

Table and results

Semi finals

Final

Trivia
At 15 minutes of play into the final, the referee stopped the match for the public to greet president José Eduardo dos Santos, who had arrived at the stadium.

Season statistics

Top scorer
 João Machado

Most goals scored in a single match

Champions

See also
 Gira Angola

References

Angola
Angola
Girabola seasons